Close Brothers Group plc is a UK merchant banking group, providing lending, deposit taking, wealth management and securities trading. The company is listed on the London Stock Exchange and is a constituent of the FTSE 250 Index.

History

Close Brothers was founded in 1878 by William Brooks Close and his brothers Fred and James Close, who started offering farm mortgages in Sioux City, Iowa.

In 1897, William Brooks Close paid £10,000 to the US government for the right to build Alaska's first railway the White Pass and Yukon Route.

It was the subject of a management buy-out in 1978 and was first listed on the London Stock Exchange in 1984.

In the 1980s and 1990s the company began a phase of significant expansion through the acquisition of a large number of specialist businesses which included Winterflood Securities in 1993, Hill Samuel's Corporate Finance Division in 1996 and Rea Brothers (established 1919) in 1999.

In March 2008 Close Brothers acquired UK short-term and bridging lender Commercial Acceptances Group for around £31m. In May 2009 it was announced that the corporate finance business was to be acquired by Daiwa Securities SMBC, a Japanese investment banking venture, leaving Close Brothers focused on capital markets, securities trading, lending and investment management.

Close Brothers disposed of Close Brothers Seydler Bank AG (“Seydler”), its securities business in Germany, to Oddo et Cie in 2014.

Operations
Close Brothers Banking division provides specialist lending to small and medium-sized businesses and individuals across a diverse range of asset classes, and also offers deposit taking services.

Winterflood, a leading market maker in the UK, trades in relevant MTFs and major dark pools and covers nearly all LSE listed stocks, as well as Alternative Investment Market (AIM) and ICAP Securities and Derivatives Exchange.

The company's chief executive is Adrian Sainsbury, who has been in the role since September 2020. The company faced criticism over the size of his pay increase in November 2021. Its board has been chaired by Mike Biggs since May 2017.

References

Close Brothers Group
Close Brothers Group
Close Brothers Group
Close Brothers Group
Close Brothers Group
Close Brothers Group
Close Brothers Group
Close Brothers Group
Close Brothers Group